In enzymology, a sinapoylglucose---choline O-sinapoyltransferase is an enzyme that catalyzes the chemical reaction

1-O-sinapoyl-beta-D-glucose + choline  D-glucose + sinapoylcholine

Thus, the two substrates of this enzyme are 1-O-sinapoyl-beta-D-glucose and choline, whereas its two products are D-glucose and sinapoylcholine (sinapine).

This enzyme belongs to the family of transferases, specifically those acyltransferases transferring groups other than aminoacyl groups.  The systematic name of this enzyme class is 1-O-(4-hydroxy-3,5-dimethoxycinnamoyl)-beta-D-glucose:choline 1-O-(4-hydroxy-3,5-dimethoxycinnamoyl)transferase. This enzyme is also called sinapine synthase.  This enzyme participates in phenylpropanoid biosynthesis.

References

 

EC 2.3.1
Enzymes of unknown structure